Marco Antonio Cornez Bravo (15 October 1957 – 21 May 2022) was a Chilean footballer who played as a goalkeeper who for Club Deportivo Palestino, Universidad Católica, Club de Deportes Antofagasta, Everton de Viña del Mar and Municipal Iquique, scoring 24 goals between 1975 and 1998.

Cornez was an unused reserve goalkeeper for Chile at the 1982 FIFA World Cup. His international career lasted from 1982 to 1995, during which time he won 20 caps.

He discovered Christiane Endler.

He died on 21 May 2022 from stomach cancer that was diagnosed several months ago.

Personal life
Cornez was the biological father of Nicolás Córdova.

References

External links
 

1957 births
2022 deaths
Footballers from Santiago
Chilean footballers
Chile international footballers
Club Deportivo Palestino footballers
Club Deportivo Universidad Católica footballers
C.D. Antofagasta footballers
Regional Atacama footballers
Everton de Viña del Mar footballers
Deportes Linares footballers
Deportes Temuco footballers
Deportes Iquique footballers
Association football goalkeepers
1982 FIFA World Cup players
1983 Copa América players
1987 Copa América players
1989 Copa América players
1991 Copa América players
1995 Copa América players
Deaths from stomach cancer
Deaths from cancer in Chile